The Kutim is a river in Perm Krai, Russia, a right tributary of the Uls, which in turn is a tributary of the Vishera. The source of the river is located near the border with Sverdlovsk Oblast. Main tributaries: Bolshaya Surya, Sredny Kutim, Lyampa Kutimskaya (left).

References 

Rivers of Perm Krai